Zahed Mohamed (born June 24, 1992, in Alexandria), also known as Zahed Salem, is a professional squash player who represented Egypt.

Mohamed has enjoyed a meteoric rise up the World Rankings in recent years and has performed consistently well since he joined the PSA World Tour as a 17-year-old.

He lifted his first PSA World Tour title in 2011 at the Al Hassan Squash Open where he bested Qualifier Mazen Hesham in a comfortable 3–0 final rout.

He doubled his title tally a year later when he won the Royal Jordanian Squash Open with local player Ahmad Al-Saraj being the unlucky party this time round.

A number of runner-up finishes followed over the next two years with a 3–2 defeat to Ali Farag in the 2015 Alexandria Open finale particularly proving to be a near miss.

References

External links 
 
 
 

Egyptian male squash players
Living people
1992 births
Sportspeople from Alexandria
21st-century Egyptian people